Rosy Jack World is an EP recording by the Blake Babies, released in 1991 (see 1991 in music). The album title was taken from a song on The Frogs 1989 album, "It's Only Right and Natural".

Track listing

"Temptation Eyes" - 2:59 (Harvey Price, Daniel Walsh)
"Downtime" - 3:15 (John Strohm)
"Take Me" - 3:14 (Juliana Hatfield, John Strohm)
"Severed Lips" - 4:15 (J Mascis)
"Nirvana" - 4:03 (Juliana Hatfield)

Personnel
Juliana Hatfield - vocals, bass, acoustic guitar and piano
John Strohm - vocals, guitar
Freda Love - drums
Henry Rollins - sampled voice on "Downtime"
Diamanda Galás - sampled voice on "Downtime"

Production
Producer: Gary Smith, Blake Babies and Paul Mahern
Engineer: Steve Haigler and Paul Mahern
Design: Lane Wurster
Photography: Kyle S. Burkhart

References

Blake Babies albums
1991 EPs
Albums produced by Gary Smith (record producer)